Steal Moon is a Japanese manga written and illustrated by Makoto Tateno. The manga is published in Japan by Nihonbungeisha and in Taiwan by Ever Glory Publishing.

The manga is licensed for an English-language release in North America by Digital Manga Publishing.

Plot
Nozomi earns money through street fights. One day, he meets a stronger man named Coyote, who gets him to bet his freedom on the outcome of their fight. Nozomi loses and becomes Coyote's slave and has to work in an online peep room known as "Digital Angels", and for a group of mysterious men who call themselves "Serene". They inform him of a secret surveillance camera that watches over the city, which they plan to destroy. Nozomi works with them to stop the camera, and to buy his freedom so that he can return to his normal life.

Reception
Mania.com's Danielle Van Gorder commends the manga for its plot. Comic Book Bin's Leroy Douresseaux comments that the manga is more sci-fi than it is yaoi.

References

External links

 Active Anime review of Vol. 2
Mania 2
CBB 2

2006 manga
Digital Manga Publishing titles
Josei manga
Nihon Bungeisha manga
Romance anime and manga
Science fiction anime and manga
Yaoi anime and manga